The 2008 Tour de Langkawi was the 13th edition of the Tour de Langkawi, a cycling stage race that took place in Malaysia. It started on 9 February in Alor Setar and ended on 17 February in Kuala Lumpur. This race was rated by the Union Cycliste Internationale (UCI) as a 2.HC race category and was highest ranked stage race on the 2007–08 UCI Asia Tour.

Moldova's Ruslan Ivanov emerged as the winner of the race, followed by Matthieu Sprick second and Gustavo César third. Aurélien Clerc won the points classification category and Filippo Savini won the mountains classification category.  won the team classification category.

Stages
The cyclists competed in 9 stages, covering a distance of 1,377.4 kilometres. The route for the Tour was unveiled on 17 December 2007 and revised on 31 December 2007. The traditional final race, criterium in Merdeka Square was also brought back to the race schedule.
On January 23, 2008, it was announced that the route for Stage 8 Maran to Genting Highlands had been replaced with a route from Temerloh to Fraser's Hill due to the cyclist's safety reason. For the first time in the Tour's history, Genting Highlands route was not included in the race schedule.

Classification leadership

Final standings

General classification

Points classification

Mountains classification

Asian rider classification

Team classification

Asian team classification

List of teams and riders
A total of 25 teams were invited to participate in the 2008 Tour de Langkawi. Out of the 148 riders, a total of 131 riders made it to the finish in Kuala Lumpur.

 Simon Gerrans
 Sébastien Hinault
 Jeremy Hunt
 Jean-Marc Marino
 Maxime Méderel
 Nicolas Roche

 José Serpa
 Danilo Hondo
 Ruslan Ivanov
 Carlos José Ochoa
 Jackson Rodríguez
 Denis Bertolini
South Africa
 Ian McCleod
 David George
 Waylon Woolcock
 Jacobus Venter
 Nolan Hoffman
 Dennis van Niekerk

 Stefan Loefler
 Alex Coutts
 Erik Hoffmann
 Lai Kuan-Hua
 Peng Kuei-Hsiang

 Pavel Brutt
 Serguei Klimov
 Alberto Loddo
 Walter Pedraza
 Yauhen Sobal
 Nikolai Trusov

 Hidenori Nodera
 Tomoya Kano
 Yoshimasa Hirose
 Yusuke Hatanaka
 Yoshiyuki Abe
 Yoshinori Iino

 Mathieu Claude
 Stef Clement
 Aurélien Clerc
 Rony Martias
 Matthieu Sprick
 Johann Tschopp

 Alexandre Usov
 Tanel Kangert
 Cédric Pineau
 Jean-Charles Sénac
 Blaise Sonnery
 Stijn Vandenberg

 Guillermo Bongiorno
 Julio Alberto Pérez
 Mauro Abel Richeze
 Filippo Savini
 Francesco Tomei
 Matteo Priamo

 David García Dapena
 Gustavo César
 Ramon Troncoso
 Juan Mouron
 Alejandro Paleo
 Vladimir Isaichev

 Matthew Wilson
 Benjamin Brooks
 Fabio Cazabria
 Glen Chadwick
 Moisés Aldape
 Ian MacGregor

 Enrico Rossi
 Marco Corsini
 Massimiliano Maisto
 Stefan Trafelet
 Diego Nosotti
Team ISTA
 Rolf Hofbauer
 Nico Keinath
 Joerg Lehmann
 Christoph Meschenmoser
 Robin Schmuda
 Nikolai Schwarz
SouthAustralia.com–AIS
 Simon Clarke
 Zakkari Dempster
 William Ford
 Benjamin King
 Wesley Sulzberger
 Johnnie Walker

Meitan Hompo-GDR
 Yukiya Arashiro
 Koji Fukushima
 Shinichi Fukushima
 Takashi Miyazawa
 Miyataka Shimizu
 Ng Yong Li

 Jai Crawford
 Serguei Kudentsov
 Li Fuyu
 Xing Yandong
 Loh Sea Keong
 Ken Onodera

 Abbas Saeidi Tanha
 Amir Zargari
 Hassan Maleki
 Mehdi Faridi
 Mehdi Sohrabi
 Farshad Salehian

 Anuar Manan
 Ahmad Haidar Anuawar
 Bernard Sulzberger
 Mohd Sayuti Mohd Zahit
 Tonton Susanto
 Ariehan Ryan
Polygon Sweet Nice
 Hari Fitrianto
 Rizza Abdullah Pahlavi
 Vyacheslav Dyadichkin
 Herwin Jaya
 Vladimir Lopez
 Budi Santoso
Seoul Cycling Team
 Park Sung-Baek
 Park Seon-Ho
 Gong Hyo-Suk
 Lee Won-Jae
 Yoo Ki-Hong
 Kim Gu-Hyeon

MNCF Cycling Team
 Amir Mustafa Rusli
 Mohd Jasmin Ruslan
 Mohd Saiful Anuar Abd Aziz
 Mohamed Harrif Salleh
 Thum Weng Kin
 Harnizam Basri

 Stuart Shaw
 Peter McDonald
 Mitchell Docker
 Robert Williams
 Gene Bates
 Mark O'Brien
New Zealand
 Jeremy Yates
 Justin Kerr
 Ashley Whitehead
 Paul Odlin
 Scott Lyttle
 Joseph Chapman
Hong Kong
 Chan Chun Hing
 Wu Kin San
 Lam Kai Tsun
 Tang Wang Yip
 Ko Siu Wai
 Yeung Ying Hon
Malaysia
 Suhardi Hassan
 Muhammad Fauzan Ahmad Lutfi
 Mohamed Zamri Salleh
 Mohd Rauf Nur Misbah
 Mohd Faris Abd Razak
 Muhamad Firdaus Daud

References

Tour de Langkawi
2008 in road cycling
2008 in Malaysian sport